Ellen van Maris (born 1957 in Amstelveen) is a former professional female bodybuilder from the Netherlands.

Biography

Van Maris competed at the local and national level in the Netherlands for two years, before earning her pro card by winning the lightweight class at the Women's World Amateur Championship in 1984. She then competed for six consecutive years in the Ms. Olympia contests, never finishing lower than ninth. Her best showing came in 1987, when she finished second behind Cory Everson. Van Maris was inducted into the IFBB Hall of Fame in 2004.

Contest history

1982 Randstad Championships - 3rd
1982 Grand Prix, Netherlands - 5th
1982 Dutch Championships - 2nd
1982 European Grand Prix - 2nd
1983 Grand Prix, Brussels - 3rd
1983 Grand Prix, Netherlands - 1st
1983 European Championships - 4th
1984 European Championships - 3rd
1984 Dutch Nationals - 1st
1984 Women's World Amateurs - 1st (LW)
1984 IFBB Ms. Olympia - 9th
1985 IFBB Ms. Olympia - 7th
1986 IFBB Ms. Olympia - 3rd
1987 IFBB Ms. Olympia - 2nd
1988 IFBB Ms. Olympia - 5th
1989 IFBB Ms. Olympia - 5th

References

McGough, Peter, Joe Roark, and Steve Wennerstrom, "Joe Weider's Bodybuilding Hall of Fame Inductees for the Year 2004", Flex, January, 2004
Roark, Joe, "Featuring 2004 Hall of Fame Inductee: Ellen Van Maris", Flex, August, 2004

External links
IFBB Hall of Fame profile
Ellen van Maris articles

1957 births
Living people
Dutch female bodybuilders
Professional bodybuilders
People from Amstelveen